UB-145 was a German Type UB III submarine or U-boat built for the German Imperial Navy during World War I. Incomplete at the end of the war, she was surrendered to the Allies at Harwich on 27 March 1919, and then taken to Chatham Dockyard as a potential subject for experimental work, but was never so-employed. She was sold to M. Lynch & Sons on 22 July 1920 for £2,000, and towed to Rochester, Kent. After being stripped of any reusable material, the hulk was dumped in shallow water in the Medway estuary, along with those of UB-144 and UB-150. The remains of all three - partly broken up in-situ during 1939–45, with one significantly better preserved than the other two - remain visible, but it is unclear which wreck is which.

Construction

She was built by AG Weser of Bremen and following just under a year of construction, launched at Kiel in October 1918. UB-145 carried 10 torpedoes and was armed with a  deck gun. UB-145 had a displacement of  while surfaced and  when submerged. Her engines would have enabled her to travel at  when surfaced and  when submerged.

References

Notes

Citations

Bibliography 

 

German Type UB III submarines
World War I submarines of Germany
1918 ships
Ships built in Bremen (state)